Pushkino is a rural locality (a settlement) and the administrative center of Pushkinskoye Rural Settlement, Sevsky District, Bryansk Oblast, Russia. The population was 275 as of 2010. There are 5 streets.

Geography 
Pushkino is located 14 km west of Sevsk (the district's administrative centre) by road. Trudovik is the nearest rural locality.

References 

Rural localities in Sevsky District